Magliano Sabina is a  (municipality) in the Province of Rieti in the Italian region of Latium, located about  north of Rome and about  west of Rieti.

Magliano Sabina borders the following municipalities: Calvi dell'Umbria, Civita Castellana, Collevecchio, Gallese, Montebuono, Orte, Otricoli.

The Sabina Cathedral is also known as the Concattedrale di San Liberatore Vescovo e Martire.

Demographic evolution

References

External links
 www.maglianosabina.com/

Cities and towns in Lazio